Subhash Desai (born 12 July 1942) is an Indian politician and leader of Shiv Sena from Maharashtra. He is a member of Maharashtra Legislative Council. He had represented Goregaon (Vidhan Sabha constituency) in 1990, 2004 and 2009.
Desai took charge as the Cabinet Minister of Industries in 2014. He was also the guardian minister of Aurangabad district.

Positions held
 1990: Elected to Maharashtra Legislative Assembly (1st term)
 2004: Re-Elected to Maharashtra Legislative Assembly (2nd term)
 2009: Re-Elected to Maharashtra Legislative Assembly (3rd term)
 2009-2014: Shiv Sena Legislature Party Leader in the Maharashtra Legislative Assembly
 2005 Onwards: Leader, Shiv Sena 
 2014: Cabinet Minister of Industries in Maharashtra State Government
 2014 - 2019: Guardian minister of Mumbai City district
 2015: Elected to Maharashtra Legislative Council (1st term)
 2016: Elected to Maharashtra Legislative Council (2nd term)
 2016: Cabinet Minister of Industries and Mining in Maharashtra State Government
 2019: Appointed minister of Industries, Mining and Marathi Language
 2020: Appointed guardian minister of Aurangabad district
 2022: Appointed minister of Urban Development and Public Works (Public Undertakings).

See also
 Uddhav Thackeray ministry
 Devendra Fadnavis ministry

References

External links
 official website

Shiv Sena politicians
Living people
State cabinet ministers of Maharashtra
Politicians from Mumbai
1942 births
Maharashtra MLAs 1990–1995
Maharashtra MLAs 2004–2009
Maharashtra MLAs 2009–2014
Members of the Maharashtra Legislative Council